This is a list of famous or notable people who were born in or lived in Baltimore, Maryland.



A
Horace Abbott (1806–1887), born in Sudbury, Massachusetts, moved to Baltimore in 1836, iron manufacturer, supplied the armor for USS Monitor
Arunah Shepherdson Abell (1806–1888), born in East Providence, Rhode Island, founder of the Baltimore Sun
David T. Abercrombie (1867–1931), born in and raised in Baltimore, founder of Abercrombie & Fitch
Don Abney (1923–2000), jazz pianist
Rosalie Silber Abrams (1916–2009), first female and Jewish majority leader in Maryland State Senate
Henry Adams (1858 Germany – 1929 Baltimore), prominent mechanical engineer, co-founder of ASHVE
Otto Eugene Adams (1889–1968), architect
Charles Adler Jr. (1899–1980), inventor
Larry Adler (1914–2001), harmonica player
Spiro T. Agnew (1918–1996), born in Baltimore County; Governor of Maryland and Vice-President of the United States under Richard Nixon
Felix Agnus (1839–1925), Union Army general, editor and publisher of Baltimore American newspaper, buried under Black Aggie
John W. Albaugh (1837–1909), actor
Franklin A. Alberger (1825–1877), Mayor of Buffalo, New York
William Albert (1816–1879), U.S. Representative, born in Baltimore
Grant Aleksander (born 1959), actor
John Aler (born 1949), lyric tenor
Hattie Alexander (1901–1968), pediatrician and microbiologist
Robert Alexander (1863–1941), World War I general, commander of 77th Infantry Division
Devin Allen, photographer and photojournalist
All Time Low, pop punk band formed in Baltimore by Jack Barakat, Rian Dawson, Alex Gaskarth, and Zack Merrick
Yari Allnutt (born 1970), soccer player
Cecilia Altonaga (born 1962), judge of United States District Court for the Southern District of Florida
Rafael Alvarez (born 1958), journalist
John Patrick Amedori (born 1987), actor
Tori Amos (born 1963), born in North Carolina, grew up in Baltimore; singer, songwriter and pianist
Adrian Amos (born 1993), safety for the Green Bay Packers
William H. Amoss (1936–1997), politician, former Maryland State Senator
Charles W. Anderson, awarded Medal of Honor
Curt Anderson (born 1949), politician, broadcast journalist, member of Maryland House of Delegates
Mignon Anderson (1892–1983), silent film actress
Richard Snowden Andrews (1830–1903), architect, Confederate officer
Peter Angelos (born 1929), born in Pittsburgh, attorney, owner of the Baltimore Orioles
Carmelo Anthony (born 1984), born in New York, grew up in Baltimore; professional basketball player formerly for the Oklahoma City Thunder, New York Knicks, Denver Nuggets, and Houston Rockets
George Armistead (1780–1818), born in Virginia, Commander of Fort McHenry during the Battle of Baltimore
Lewis Addison Armistead (1817–1863), born in North Carolina, Confederate general mortally wounded at Gettysburg, buried in Baltimore
Annie Armstrong (1850–1938), Baptist missionary
Bess Armstrong (born 1953), actress
John S. Arnick (1933–2006), politician, former member of the Maryland House of Delegates
Howard Ashman (1950–1991), Academy Award-winning lyricist (The Little Mermaid, Beauty and the Beast, Little Shop of Horrors)
John Astin (born 1930), TV and film actor, Gomez Addams on The Addams Family television series
Lisa Aukland (born 1957), professional bodybuilder and powerlifter
Robert Austrian (1916–2007), physician, medical researcher, winner of Albert Lasker Clinical Medical Research Award
Tavon Austin (born 1991), wide receiver for Dallas Cowboys
Flo Ayres (born 1923), nationally known radio actress
Leah Ayres (born 1957), actress

B
David Bachrach (1845–1921), lived in Baltimore, photographer, took only known photo of Lincoln giving the Gettysburg Address; uncle to Gertrude Stein
Penn Badgley (born 1986), born in Baltimore, actor, Dan Humphrey from Gossip Girl
Russell Baker (1925–2019), raised in Baltimore, writer, political columnist for The New York Times
Virginia S. Baker (1921–1998), nicknamed "Baltimore's First Lady of Fun", the Patterson Park Recreation Center in Baltimore City is named in her honor
Florence E. Bamberger (1882–1965), American pedagogue, school supervisor, and progressive education advocate
Louis Bamberger (1855–1944), businessman, department store owner, and philanthropist
Joshua Barney (1759–1818), commodore in U.S. Navy
John Barth (born 1930), author
Gary Bartz (born 1940), jazz saxophonist
Bernadette Bascom (born 1962), R&B singer
Robbie Basho (1940–1986), guitarist and singer
Marty Bass, WJZ-TV weatherman
Sylvia Beach (1887–1962), owned Shakespeare and Company, key bookstore for expatriates in Paris
Madison Smartt Bell (born 1957), novelist and professor at Goucher College
Jacob Beser (1921–1992), only person to crew both atomic bomb missions in World War II
Eubie Blake (1887–1983), composer of ragtime, jazz and popular music
Shelly Blake-Plock (born 1974), entrepreneur and musician
Nili Block (born 1995), Israeli world champion kickboxer and Muay Thai fighter
Clarence W. Blount (1921–2003), Maryland State Senate
A. Aubrey Bodine (1906–1970), photojournalist for The Baltimore Sun
Tyrone "Muggsy" Bogues (born 1965), professional basketball player
John R. Bolton (born 1958), National Security Advisor of the United States, former United States Ambassador to the United Nations
Charles Joseph Bonaparte (1851–1921), U.S. Attorney General, Secretary of the Navy, relative of Napoleon
Keith Booth (born 1974), Maryland Terrapins assistant coach, former Chicago Bulls player
William S. Booze (1862–1933), former U.S. Congressman for Maryland's 3rd District
Julie Bowen (Julie Bowen Luetkemeyer; born 1970), film and TV actress, star of Modern Family
Ryan Boyle (born 1981), MLL and NLL lacrosse player, graduate of the Gilman School
Cora Belle Brewster (1859 – after 1906), physician, surgeon, medical writer, editor
Flora A. Brewster (1852–1919), Baltimore's first women surgeon
Margaret Sutton Briscoe (1864–1941), American short story writer
Conrad Brooks (1931–2017), B movie actor
George William Brown, Mayor of Baltimore during Pratt Street Riot
Rosey Brown (1932–2004), football star for New York Giants; member of Pro Football Hall of Fame; attended Morgan State University in Baltimore
James M. Buchanan (1803–1876), Judge and U.S. Ambassador to Denmark
Robert C. Buchanan (1811–1878), Union army general
Tony Bunn (born 1957), jazz bassist, composer, producer
 Elise Burgin (born 1962), tennis player
Elizabeth Burmaster (born 1954), Superintendent of Public Instruction of Wisconsin
Beverly Lynn Burns (born 1949), became first woman Boeing 747 airline captain on July 18, 1984
Ed Burns (born 1946), screenwriter and former homicide and narcotics police detective
David Byrne (born 1952), songwriter for new wave band Talking Heads, grew up in Baltimore County

C

Cab Calloway (1907–1994), jazz singer and bandleader, raised in Baltimore
Cecil Calvert, 2nd Baron Baltimore (1605–1675), proprietary governor
Leonard Calvert (1606–1647), first governor of Province of Maryland
Nick Campofreda (1914–1959), NFL player
Ben Cardin (born 1943), member of United States Senate and former member of United States House of Representatives
Meyer Cardin (1907–2005), Democratic state delegate (1936–38), former Judge Baltimore City Supreme Bench
John Carroll (1735–1815), first Roman Catholic archbishop in U.S.
Ben Carson (born 1951), born and raised in Detroit, Michigan; United States Secretary of Housing and Urban Development; noted neurosurgeon at Johns Hopkins Hospital
Hetty Cary (1836–1892), maker of one of first three battle flags of the Confederacy
Sam Cassell (born 1969), professional basketball player and coach
Brett Cecil (born 1986), Major League Baseball pitcher for the St. Louis Cardinals
Dennis Chambers (born 1959), drummer (P-Funk All Stars, Steely Dan)
Norman "Chubby" Chaney (1914–1936), short-lived child actor, Our Gang
Josh Charles (born 1971), actor, Sports Night, The Good Wife, Dead Poets Society
Charley Chase (Parrott) (1893–1940), silent and sound film comedian, director
Samuel Chase (1741–1811), signer of Declaration of Independence and US Supreme Court judge
Robert F. Chew (1960–2013), actor, The Wire
John Christ (born 1965), rock musician, Danzig classic lineup guitarist
Tom Clancy (1947–2013), author of The Hunt for Red October and many other novels, several of which were made into motion pictures
Martha Clarke (born 1944), modern choreographer
Mary Pat Clarke (born 1941), Baltimore City Council
Kevin Clash (born 1960), puppeteer best known for portrayal of Elmo on Sesame Street
Charles Pearce Coady (1868–1934), U.S. Congressman (D) for Maryland's 3rd District, 1913–1921
Ta-Nehisi Coates (born 1975), MacArthur Fellow and National Book Award winning author of Between the World and Me
 Andy Cohen (1904–1988), Major League Baseball second baseman and coach
Claribel Cone (1864–1929), with sister Etta, collected art of Matisse, Picasso, and Van Gogh
Hans Conried (1917–1982), comic character actor and voice actor
Kenny Cooper (born 1984), professional soccer player for TSV 1860 Munich in 2. Bundesliga
Miriam Cooper (1891–1976), silent film actress, co-starred in The Birth of a Nation
Martha Coston (1826–1904), inventor and businesswoman
Thomas Cromwell Corner (1865–1938), portrait artist
Elijah E. Cummings (1951–2019), U.S. Congressman (D)  for Maryland's 7th District
Ida R. Cummings (1867–1958), Baltimore's first black Kindergarten teacher
Mary C. Curtis (born 1953), American journalist
Harvey Cushing (1869–1939), pioneer neurosurgeon at Johns Hopkins Hospital

D
Thomas D'Alesandro Jr. (1903–1987), Mayor of Baltimore, U.S. Representative, father of Nancy Pelosi
Brian Dannelly, director (Saved!, Weeds, United States of Tara)
Clay Davenport, sabermetrician and computer programmer for NOAA
Gervonta Davis (born 1994), boxer
Henrietta Vinton Davis (1860–1941), elocutionist, dramatist, and impersonator
Angela Dawson, community activist murdered at age 36 along with her family in 2002
Dan Deacon (born 1981), electronic musician
Buddy Deane (1924–2003), disc jockey, host of TV dance show that inspired the movie Hairspray.
Olive Dennis (1885–1957), railroad engineer
Divine (1945–1988), drag queen persona of Glen Milstead, actor and singer
Juan Dixon (born 1978), basketball player at University of Maryland, College Park and pro ranks
Sheila Dixon (born 1951), first female mayor of Baltimore
Stephen Dixon (1936–2019), author
Mary Dobkin (1902–1987), baseball coach
Fitzhugh Dodson (1923–1993), American clinical psychologist, lecturer, educator and author
John Doe (musician) (born 1953), guitarist for the band X
James Lowry Donaldson (1814–1885), Union army general
Henry Grattan Donnelly (1850–1931), author and playwright
Art Donovan (1924–2013), Baltimore Colts, Pro Football Hall of Famer
Joey Dorsey (born 1983), professional basketball player for the Houston Rockets
Frederick Douglass (1818–1895), abolitionist, statesman, orator, editor, author, prominent figure in African American history
Ronnie Dove (born 1935), pop and country singer who had a string of 21 hits on Billboard from 1964 to 1969
Dru Hill, R&B singing group
W.E.B. Du Bois (1868–1963), founder of the NAACP, lived in Baltimore 1939–1950
Mildred Dunnock (1901–1991), Oscar-nominated theater, film and television actress
Ferdinand Durang (c. 1785 – 1831), actor, best known as the first person to sing publicly Francis Scott Key's "The Star-Spangled Banner"
Adam Duritz (born 1964), singer with Counting Crows
Charles S. Dutton (born 1951), actor

E
Joni Eareckson Tada (born 1949), Christian author and singer
Tyde-Courtney Edwards (born 1987), dancer and businesswoman
Robert Ehrlich (born 1957), former U.S. Congressman, 60th Governor of Maryland
Milton S. Eisenhower (1899–1985), president of Johns Hopkins University 1956–1967
Louis E. Eliasberg (1896–1976), financier and numismatist known for assembling the only complete collection of U.S. coins ever
Cass Elliot (1941–1974), born Ellen Naomi Cohen, singer, member of The Mamas & the Papas
Donald B. Elliott (born 1931), member of Maryland House of Delegates
James Ellsworth (born 1984), professional wrestler
Joan Erbe (1926–2014), painter and sculptor
Cal Ermer (1923–2008), Minnesota Twins manager
Ellery Eskelin (born 1959), jazz saxophonist, raised in Baltimore
Shinah Solomon Etting (1744–1822), matriarch of one of Baltimore's first Jewish families
Solomon Etting (1764–1847) merchant and politician 
Damon Evans (born 1949), actor best known as the second to portray Lionel Jefferson on the CBS sitcom The Jeffersons

F
Diane Fanning, true crime author and novelist
Anna Faris (born 1976), actress, notably for Scary Movie, born but not raised in Baltimore
Nathaniel Fick (born 1977), U.S. Marine Captain, author, and technology executive
Walter Fillmore (1933–2017), U.S. Brigadier General, United States Marine Corps
Steven Fischer (born 1972), film producer, two-time Emmy Award nominee, raised in northeast Baltimore City
Ray Fisher (born 1987), actor, notably for Justice League
George Fisher (born 1970), vocalist for death metal band Cannibal Corpse
F. Scott Fitzgerald (1896–1940), author; lived late in life in Baltimore, buried in Rockville
Paul Ford (1901–1976), actor, notably for The Phil Silvers Show and The Music Man
Edward R. Foreman (1808–1885), meteorologist
Jane Frank (1918–1986), abstract expressionist artist, painter, sculptor, mixed media and textile artist, pupil of Hans Hofmann
Gertrude Franklin (1858–1913), singer and music educator
George A Frederick (1842–1924), architect of Baltimore City Hall
Antonio Freeman (born 1972), football wide receiver, most notably for Green Bay Packers
 Mona Freeman (1926–2014), actress, notably for Black Beauty in 1946
William H. French (1815–1881), Union army general
John Friedberg (born 1961), Olympic fencer
 Paul Friedberg (born 1959), Olympic fencer
Bill Frisell (born 1951), jazz guitarist and composer

G
Joe Gans (1874–1910), lightweight boxing champion
John Work Garrett (1820–1884), banker, philanthropist, and president of the Baltimore and Ohio Railroad (B&O)
Mary Garrett (1854–1915), suffragist and philanthropist
Alex Gaskarth (born 1987), singer for rock band All Time Low
Lee Gatch (1902–1968), abstract artist
Rudy Gay (born 1986), basketball player for University of Connecticut and NBA's Memphis Grizzlies, Sacramento Kings, Toronto Raptors, and San Antonio Spurs
Herb Gerwig (1931–2011), professional wrestler of the 1960s and 1970s known as Killer Karl Kox
James Gibbons (1834–1921), cardinal, 9th Roman Catholic Archbishop of Baltimore
Garretson W. Gibson  (1832–1910), President of Liberia 1900–1904
Horatio Gates Gibson (1827–1924), Union Army general
Adam Gidwitz (born 1982), children's book author
Duane Gill (born 1953), former WWE Wrestler (as Gillberg) who resides in Severn, Maryland
Anita Gillette (born 1936), actress and game show personality
Dondre Gilliam (born 1977), football player
Ira Glass (born 1959), radio personality; host of This American Life, distributed by Public Radio International; cousin of Philip Glass
Philip Glass (born 1937), minimalist composer
Jacob Glushakow (1914–2000), painter
Duff Goldman (born 1974), food artist, cake baker, television personality
Minna Gombell (1892–1973), stage and film actress
Tamir Goodman (born 1982), basketball player
Jaimy Gordon (born 1944), author, winner of National Book Award for Fiction
Brian Gottfried (born 1952), tennis player, reached Nº3 in the world in 1977
Elmer Greensfelder (1892–1966), playwright

H
Virginia Hall (1906–1982), OSS agent
Edith Hamilton (1867–1963), "the greatest woman Classicist"
Elaine Hamilton-O'Neal (1920–2010), artist, born in Catonsville near Baltimore; graduated from Baltimore's Maryland Institute College of Art
Louis Hamman (1877–1946), physician and namesake of Hamman's sign, Hamman's syndrome and Hamman-Rich syndrome
Mary Hamman (1907–1984), writer and editor, daughter of Louis Hamman
Dashiell Hammett (1894–1961), detective writer of Maltese Falcon, born in Maryland and worked as a detective in Baltimore
Steve Handelsman (born 1948), journalist
Frances Harper (1825–1911), Abolitionist leader
Elaine D. Harmon (1919–2015), American aviator
Ken Harris (1963–2008), City Councilman
David Hasselhoff (born 1952), actor
Marcus Hatten (born 1980), basketball player
Emily Spencer Hayden (1869–1949), photographer
Raymond V. Haysbert (1920–2010), business executive and civil rights leader
Maya Hayuk (born 1969), fine artist and muralist
Mo'Nique Hicks (born 1967), comedian, television and film actress from Woodlawn, Maryland
Alger Hiss (1904–1996), State Department official, accused of being a Soviet spy and convicted of perjury
Katie Hoff (born 1989), Olympic medalist swimmer and multiple World Aquatics Championships gold medalist; lives in Baltimore
Billie Holiday (1915–1959), born Eleanora Fagan Gough, jazz singer
Sidney Hollander (1881–1972), humanitarian and civil and political rights activist
Henry Holt (1840–1926), publisher, founded Henry Holt & Company in 1873
Johns Hopkins (1795–1873), Quaker businessman, abolitionist and philanthropist whose bequest established Johns Hopkins University
John Eager Howard (1752–1827), soldier, Governor of Maryland, namesake of Howard County, Maryland
William Henry Howell (1860–1945), physiologist who pioneered the use of heparin as a blood anti-coagulant
Christopher Hughes (1786–1849), diplomat
Sarah T. Hughes (1896–1985), federal judge who swore in Lyndon B. Johnson aboard Air Force One after the Kennedy assassination

I
Joseph Iglehart (1891–1979), financier
Moses Ingram (born 1994), actress

J
Lillie Mae Carroll Jackson (1889–1975), pioneer civil rights activist, organizer of Baltimore branch of NAACP
Debbie Jacobs (born 1955), singer
Thomas Jane (born 1969), actor
Harry Jeffra (1914–1988), professional boxer, world bantamweight champion
Bryant Johnson (born 1981), professional football player with San Francisco 49ers
Delano Johnson (born 1988), football player
Natalie Joy Johnson (born 1978), film and stage actress, singer and dancer
Cyrus Jones (born 1993), former professional football player
LaKisha Jones (born 1980), singer
Thomas David Jones (born 1955), astronaut with doctorate in planetary science
Brian Jordan (born 1967), Major League Baseball player, briefly a pro footballer
Jerome H. Joyce(1865–1924) president of Aero Club of Baltimore
JPEGMafia (born 1989), music producer, experimental hip hop artist

K
David Kairys (born 1943), Professor of Law at Temple University School of Law
Al Kaline (1934–2020), Major League Baseball player for Detroit Tigers; Hall of Famer, never played in minor leagues
John Kassir (born 1957), actor, voice of Crypt Keeper in TV's Tales from the Crypt
David Katz (1993–2018), Jacksonville Landing shooter
Chris Keating (born 1982), lead singer and songwriter for band Yeasayer
William Henry Keeler (1931–2017), Archbishop Emeritus of Baltimore and Cardinal of Roman Catholic Church
Stacy Keibler (born 1979), actress, former professional wrestler for WWE
Thomas Kelso (Ireland 1784–1878), wealthy merchant, founder of Kelso Home, philanthropist
John Pendleton Kennedy (1795–1870), U.S. Secretary of the Navy, Congressman, speaker of Maryland General Assembly, author, led effort to end slavery in Maryland
James Lawrence Kernan (1838–1912), Yiddish theater manager and philanthropist
Stu Kerr (1928–1994), television personality and weatherman
Ernest Keyser (1876–1959), sculptor
Stanton Kidd (born 1992), basketball player for Hapoel Jerusalem in  the Israeli Basketball Premier League
Greg Kihn (born 1950), pop musician
David J. Kim (born 1979), publisher of Teen Ink, co-founder of C2 Education
J. William Kime (1934–2006), Commandant of U.S. Coast Guard, 1990–1994
D.King (born 1989), rapper
Mel Kiper Jr. (born 1960), football analyst
Benjamin Klasmer (1891–1949), musician
Jim Knipple (born 1977), professional stage director
 Adam Kolarek (born 1989), pitcher in the Los Angeles Dodgers organization
Jeff Koons (born 1955), artist and sculptor, graduate of Maryland Institute College of Art, Baltimore
K-Swift (1978–2008), born Khia Edgerton, club/radio DJ, producer, radio personality at WERQ
Ruth Krauss (1901–1993), author of children's books
Steve Krulevitz (born 1951), American-Israeli tennis player

L
Henrietta Lacks (1920–1951), namesake of HeLa cell line
Mary Lange (ca. 1784 – 1882), foundress of the Oblate Sisters of Providence and a school for free black children
Bucky Lasek (born 1972), pro skateboarder
Maysa Leak (born 1966), jazz singer
Jerry Leiber (1933–2011), lyricist ("Hound Dog", "Stand by Me", "Poison Ivy", "Is That All There Is?", "Kansas City")
Noah Lennox (born 1978), known as Panda Bear, sings and plays drums and electronics in band Animal Collective
 Ivan Leshinsky (born 1947), American-Israeli basketball player
Barry Levinson (born 1942), screenwriter, Academy Award-winning film director, producer of film and television
Kevin Levrone (born 1968), IFBB professional bodybuilder, musician, actor and health club owner
Hank Levy (1927–2001), jazz composer, founder of Towson University's jazz program
Reggie Lewis (1965–1993), professional basketball player for the Boston Celtics
Reginald F. Lewis (1942–1993), businessman
Kevin Liles (born 1968), record executive; former president of Def Jam Recordings and vice president of The Island Def Jam Music Group
Eli Lilly (1838–1898), soldier, pharmaceutical chemist, industrialist, entrepreneur, founder of Eli Lilly and Company
Laura Lippman (born 1959), author of detective fiction
Alan Lloyd (1943–1986), composer, born in Baltimore
Walter Lord (1917–2002), non-fiction author
Los (born 1982), real name Carlos Coleman, rapper
Morris Louis (1912–1962), abstract expressionist painter
G. E. Lowman (1897–1965), clergyman and radio evangelist
Chris Lucas, country singer with LoCash
Katharine Lucke (1875–1962), organist and composer
Edmund C. Lynch (1885–1938), business leader graduate of Boys' Latin, Johns Hopkins and co-founder of Merrill Lynch & Co.

M
Marvin Mandel (1920–2015), former Governor of Maryland, assumed office upon resignation of Spiro Agnew
Ann Manley (c. 1828 – after 1870), brothel proprietor
Mario (born 1986), born Mario Dewar Barrett, singer, grew up in Gwynn Oak, Maryland in Baltimore County
Todd Marks (born 1976), local businessman and entrepreneur
Thurgood Marshall (1908–1993), first African American U.S. Supreme Court Justice
 Joseph Maskell (1939–2001), Catholic priest accused of sexual abuse
Nancy Mowll Mathews (born 1947), art historian, curator, and author
Aaron Maybin (born 1988), football player for Buffalo Bills, picked in 2009 NFL Draft
Ernest G. McCauley (1889–1969), aviation pioneer
Angel McCoughtry (born 1986), basketball player; first overall pick in 2009 WNBA Draft by Atlanta Dream
Jim McKay (James Kenneth McManus, 1921–2008), television sports journalist, Olympic and Wide World of Sports host
Theodore R. McKeldin (1900–1974), Governor of Maryland
H.L. Mencken (1880–1956), journalist and social critic known as "the Sage of Baltimore"
Ottmar Mergenthaler (1854–1899), inventor of Linotype machine that revolutionized the art of printing
Joe Metheny (1955–2017), murderer and suspected serial killer
Kweisi Mfume (born 1948), former CEO of NAACP and U.S. Congressman
Barbara Mikulski (born 1936), U.S. Senator
Isaiah Miles (born 1994), basketball player in the Israeli Basketball Premier League
Jamie Miller (born c. 1975), musician, drummer for Bad Religion
Steve Miller (born 1950), author of science-fiction stories and novels
Clarence M. Mitchell Jr. (1911–1984), civil rights leader
Keiffer J. Mitchell Jr. (born 1967), Baltimore City Council, grandson of civil rights leader Clarence M. Mitchell Jr.
Parren Mitchell (1922–2007), former U.S. Congressman
Colonel Thomas Hoyer Monstery (1824–1901), duellist, fencing master, mercenary and author
Garry Moore (Thomas Garrison Morfit, 1915–1993), early television host, I've Got a Secret
Lenny Moore (born 1933), running back, Baltimore Colts, member of Pro Football Hall of Fame
Phil Moore (born 1961), host of Nick Arcade
Bessie Moses (1893–1965), gynecologist, obstetrician and birth control advocate
Sean Mosley (born 1989), basketball player for Hapoel Tel Aviv B.C. of Israeli Basketball Premier League
Nick Mullen (born 1988), comedian best known as the host for the podcast Cum Town
Robert Murray (1822–1913), Surgeon General of the United States Army
Max Muscle (1963–2019), born John Czawlytko, professional wrestler known for appearances in WCW in 1990s
Clarence Muse (1889–1979), actor

N
Anita Nall (born 1976), Olympic gold medalist swimmer
Ogden Nash (1902–1971), iconic poet and humorist
Mildred Natwick (1905–1994), stage, film and television actress
Gary Neal (born 1984), professional basketball player
John Needles (1786–1878), Quaker abolitionist, master craftsman of fine furniture
James Crawford Neilson (1816–1900), architect
Jeff Nelson (born 1966), professional baseball player, middle relief pitcher
Harry Nice (1877–1941), 50th Governor of Maryland
Joe Nice (born c. 1976), dubstep DJ, moved to Baltimore from Southampton at the age of two
Brian Nichols, (born 1971), known for 2005 killing spree
Edward Norton (born 1969), actor, 3-time Academy Award nominee
Brandon Novak (born 1978), skateboarder and member of Viva La Bam

O
Ric Ocasek (1949–2019), vocalist and frontman for The Cars
Rashard Odomes (born 1996), basketball player in the Israeli Basketball Premier League
Madalyn Murray O'Hair (1919–1995), activist
Frank O'Hara (1926–1966), poet
Martin O'Malley (born 1963), born in Washington, D.C., Mayor of Baltimore, 61st Governor of Maryland
Elaine Hamilton-O'Neal (1920–2010), painter
Ken Ono (born 1968), mathematician, grew up in Towson
Dorothea Orem (1914–2007), nursing theorist, creator of self-care deficit nursing theory

P 
William Paca (1740–1799), signatory to Declaration of Independence; Governor of Maryland
Tim Page (born 1954), winner of Pulitzer Prize for Criticism; biographer of Dawn Powell
Jim Palmer (born 1945), born in New York, Baseball Hall of Fame starting pitcher for Baltimore Orioles 1965–84
 James A. Parker (19221994), African-American foreign service officer for the U.S. Department of State
Nicole Ari Parker (born 1971), actress
Bob Parsons (born 1950), entrepreneur; founder and CEO of Go Daddy
Travis Pastrana (born 1983), freestyle motocross, x-treme sports professional, spokesman for Red Bull
Bernard H. Paul (1907–2005), puppeteer known for local television show Paul's Puppets
Randy Pausch (1960–2008), former professor of computer science, human–computer interaction, and design at Carnegie Mellon University
Felicia Pearson (born 1980), actress, community volunteer, and convicted drug dealer nicknamed "Snoop", who played the eponymous character (Snoop Pearson) on The Wire
Nancy Pelosi (born 1940), U.S. Representative from California since 1987, Speaker of the House
Clarence M. Pendleton Jr. (1930–1988), chairman of U.S. Commission on Civil Rights from 1981 until death in 1988; worked in Model Cities Program in Baltimore, 1968–1970
Vincent Pettway (born 1965), boxer, light middleweight boxing champion
Michael Phelps (born 1985), swimmer from Baltimore County, multiple world-record holder, winner of more gold medals (23) and total medals (28) than any other Olympian
Tom Phoebus (1942–2019), MLB pitcher
Jada Pinkett Smith (born 1971), actress and singer
Greg Plitt (1977–2015), fitness model and actor
Art Poe, member of College Football Hall of Fame
Edgar Allan Poe (1809–1849), iconic poet, short story writer, editor and critic
Edgar Allan Poe (1871–1961), Attorney General of Maryland, 1911–1915
Gresham Poe, football head coach at Virginia in 1903
John P. Poe, Sr. (1836–1909), Attorney General of Maryland, 1891–1895
Johnny Poe (1874–1915), college football player and coach, soldier of fortune
Jack Pollack (1899–1977), politician and criminal
Gordon Porterfield, playwright, actor, poet and educator
David Portner (born 1979), musician and lead singer of experimental avant-garde artpop band Animal Collective
Parker Posey (born 1968), actress, known for Dazed and Confused, Waiting for Guffman, Scream 3, Best in Show
Emily Post (1872–1960), author of etiquette books
Walter de Curzon Poultney (1845–1929), art collector and socialite
Boog Powell (born 1941), born in Florida, baseball player for Orioles and Baltimore restaurant owner
Enoch Pratt (1808–1896), businessman and philanthropist; founded Enoch Pratt Free Library, one of oldest free public libraries in U.S.
Thomas Rowe Price Jr. (1898–1983), businessman, founder of Baltimore-based investment counsel firm T. Rowe Price
Helen Dodson Prince (1905–2002), astronomer who pioneered work in solar flares
Rain Pryor (born 1969), actress
Greg Puciato (born 1980), musician, singer, author

Q
Robin Quivers (born 1952),  sidekick of TV and radio personality Howard Stern

R
Hasim Rahman (born 1972), boxer, former World Heavyweight Champion
Jane Randall, contestant on America's Next Top Model, Cycle 15, and an IMG model
James Ransone (born 1979), actor, The Wire, Generation Kill, Sinister, adult Eddie Kaspbrak from It Chapter Two
John Rawls (1921–2002), professor of political philosophy at Harvard, author
Sam Ray (born 1991), musician, EDM project Ricky Eat Acid, and founder of band American Pleasure Club, formerly known as Teen Suicide
Lance Reddick (1962–2023), actor, Col. Cedric Daniels from The Wire
Chris Renaud (born 1966), animator and illustrator; co-director of The Lorax and Despicable Me; voice of many Minions
Hilary Rhoda (born 1987), fashion model
Adrienne Rich (1929–2012), poet, writer, teacher, and feminist
Hester Dorsey Richardson (1862–1933), author
Charles Carnan Ridgely (1760–1829), 15th Governor of Maryland
Charles G. Ridgely (1784–1848), United States Navy officer
Billy Ripken (born 1964), born in Havre de Grace, Maryland, second baseman for Baltimore Orioles
Cal Ripken Jr. (born 1960), born in Havre de Grace, infielder for Baltimore Orioles, member of Hall of Fame
Cal Ripken Sr. (1935–1999), coach and manager of Baltimore Orioles
Brooks Robinson (born 1937), born Little Rock, Arkansas, third baseman for Baltimore Orioles 1955–77, member of Hall of Fame
Lenny B. Robinson (1963–2015), born in Baltimore, charity worker who dressed up as superhero Batman
Frank Robinson (1935–2019), born in Beaumont, Texas, outfielder for Baltimore Orioles, member of Hall of Fame
Martin Rodbell (1925–1998), biochemist and molecular endocrinologist; won 1994 Nobel Prize in Physiology or Medicine
Josh Roenicke, baseball player in Cincinnati Reds organization
Eddie Rommel (1897–1970), Major League Baseball pitcher and umpire
Adeke Rose, poet, psychoanalyst and teacher<ref>{{cite web|url=http://baltimore.cbslocal.com/top-lists/best-local-poets-in-baltimore/|title=Best Local Poets in Baltimore|work=Baltimore CBS}} Retrieved August 17, 2016</ref>
Carroll Rosenbloom (1907–1979), owner of Baltimore Colts and Los Angeles Rams
Matt Rosendale (born 1960), Montana state politician and businessman
Alec Ross (born 1971), author and former Senior Advisor for Innovation to Secretary of State Hillary Clinton
Axl Rotten (1971–2016), professional wrestler
Francis Peyton Rous (1879–1970), pathologist who won Nobel Prize in Physiology or Medicine
Christopher Rouse (1949–2019), composer, Pulitzer Prize winner
James Rouse (1914–1996), pioneering real estate developer, civic activist, and philanthropist
Mike Rowe (born 1962), host of Discovery Channel program Dirty JobsRuckus, born Claude Marrow, Professional wrestler
Ruff Endz, R&B duo consisting of members David "Davinch" Chance and Dante "Chi" Jordan from Baltimore; best known for songs "No More" and "Someone to Love You"
Mike Ruocco (born 1983), singer-songwriter of bands Plunge and Cinder Road; bassist of SR-71
Dutch Ruppersberger (born 1946), U.S. Congressman (D)
Harry W. Rusk, U.S. Congressman (D) for Maryland's 3rd District, 1886–1897
Elizabeth Lownes Rust (1835–1899), philanthropist, humanitarian, Christian missionary
Babe Ruth (1895–1948), iconic baseball player for New York Yankees, member of Baseball Hall of Fame
Ida Mary Barry Ryan (1854–1917), philanthropist
Rye Rye (born 1990), real name Ryeisha Berrain, dancer and rapper

S

Pat Sajak (born 1946), television personality, Wheel of Fortune host; resides in Maryland
Al Sanders (1941–1995), TV news anchor WJZ-TV; died in Baltimore
Paul Sarbanes (1933–2020), born in Salisbury, Maryland, former member of Maryland House of Delegates from Baltimore, U.S. Congressman, U.S. Senator
William Donald Schaefer (1921–2011), Mayor of Baltimore, 58th Governor of Maryland, and 32nd Comptroller of Maryland
Jason Schappert (born 1988), aviator, born in Baltimore
Kurt L. Schmoke (born 1949), former Mayor of Baltimore, current president of the University of Baltimore
Gina Schock (born 1957), rock drummer The Go Go's, songwriter and actress
Dwight Schultz (born 1947), actor, played H.M. Murdock in The A-Team series and Lt. Reginald Barclay in Star Trek: The Next GenerationJosh Selby (born 1991), pro basketball player, former No. 1 high school prospect in U.S. according to Rivals.com
Elizabeth Ann Seton (1774–1821), established schools, founded first U.S. religious community of apostolic women, Sisters of Charity (Archdiocese of Baltimore)
Tupac Shakur (1971–1996), hip hop performer and rapper, lived on Greenmount Ave in East Baltimore for two years
Karl Shapiro (1913–2000), U.S. Poet Laureate 1946–47, born in Baltimore
Richard Sher (1948–2015), WJZ-TV newscaster, Oprah Winfrey co-host
Daniel Shiffman (born 1973), programmer, member of the board of directors of the Processing Foundation, associate arts professor
Pam Shriver (born 1962), professional tennis player and broadcaster
Sargent Shriver (1915–2011), born in Westminster, Maryland, politician, activist, driving force behind creation of Peace Corps
Eli Siegel (1902–1978), poet, critic, founder of philosophy of Aesthetic Realism
Jeff Siegel (born 1970), musician, writer, investment analyst and renewable energy expert; coined the phrase "green chip stocks"
Hubert Simmons (1924–2009), Negro league baseball pitcher for the Baltimore Elite Giants
David Simon (born 1960), journalist for The Baltimore Sun, author, television writer, producer, creator of The WireBessie Wallis Warfield Simpson (1896–1986), Duchess of Windsor
Upton Sinclair (1878–1968), author of The Jungle, Pulitzer Prize winner, born in Baltimore
Christian Siriano (born 1985), fashion designer; winner of fourth season of Project Runway; graduate of Baltimore School for the Arts
Sisqó (born 1978), real name Mark Althavan Andrews, R&B and pop singer
Cameron Snyder (1916–2010), sportswriter for The Baltimore Sun; winner of Dick McCann Memorial Award
Maelcum Soul (1940–1986), bartender, artist's model, and actress
Florence Garrettson Spooner (1840s–1935), social reformer
Raymond A. Spruance (1886–1969), U.S. Navy admiral in World War II
James Stafford (born 1932), cardinal of the Catholic Church; born in Baltimore
Melissa Stark (born 1973), television personality and sportscaster for NFL Network
John Steadman (1927–2001), sportswriter
Michael S. Steele (born 1958), Lieutenant Governor of Maryland, first African American chairman of Republican National Committee
Gertrude Stein (1874–1946), art collector
Andrew Sterett (1778–1807), U.S. Naval Officer during the Quasi-War, Captain of USS EnterpriseRichard D. Steuart (1880–1951), historian, and journalist under the pseudonym Carroll Dulaney
Victor Sulin (1942–2022), lawyer and politician
Suter Sullivan (1872–1925), professional baseball player.
Rich Swann (born 1991), professional wrestler
Donald Symington (1925–2013), actor
Stuart Symington (1901–1988), first Secretary of the Air Force; U.S. Senator from Missouri

T

Tate Kobang (born 1992), real name Joshua Goods, rapper
Evan Taubenfeld (born 1983), singer-songwriter
Michael Tearson (born 1948), pioneer underground DJ, concert and special appearance host, author, recording artist and actor
Mark Texiera (born 1980), player for New York Yankees 2009–16, 3-time All-Star
Jon Theodore (born 1973), musician, The Mars Volta's former drummer, Avril Lavigne's former guitarist
Martha Carey Thomas (1857–1935), educator, suffragist, second President of Bryn Mawr College
Tracie Thoms (born 1975), actress
A. Andrew Torrence (1902–1940), Illinois state representative
Alessandra Torres (born 1980), visual artist
F. Morris Touchstone (1897–1957), National Lacrosse Hall of Fame coach
Anne Truitt (1921–2004), minimalist sculptor
Michael Tucker (born 1944), actor, films and L.A. LawJoseph Tumpach (1912–1968), Illinois state representative
Jack Turnbull (1910–1944), National Lacrosse Hall of Fame player
Charles Yardley Turner (1850–1918), artist and muralist
Jerry Turner (1929–1987), television news anchor
Kathleen Turner (born 1954), actress, graduate of University of Maryland, Baltimore County
Anne Tyler (born 1941), Pulitzer Prize-winning novelist (The Accidental Tourist)

U
Ultra Naté (born 1968), house music singer, songwriter, producer, DJ, club promoter, and entrepreneur
Johnny Unitas (1933–2002), born in Pittsburgh; professional football player for the Baltimore Colts; in Pro Football Hall of Fame
Leon Uris (1924–2003), novelist, author of ExodusV
Matthew VanDyke (born 1979), freedom fighter and Prisoner of War in 2011 Libyan Civil War
Nikolai Volkoff (1947–2018), born in Croatia, Yugoslavia, WWE Hall of Fame wrestler, spent time in Baltimore area.

W
LaMonte Wade (born 1994), a professional baseball player in the Minnesota Twins organization. 
Evan Sewell Wallace (1982–2017), Black Paisley Records, hip hop artist
Henry Walters (1848–1931), rail magnate (Atlantic Coast Line) and founder of Walters Art Museum in Baltimore
Dante Washington (born 1970), professional soccer striker
John Waters (born 1946), filmmaker
John K. Waters (1906–1989), U.S. Army four-star general
D. Watkins (born 1980), author 
Earl Weaver (1930–2013), born in St. Louis, Missouri, longtime manager of the Baltimore Orioles; Baseball Hall Of Fame inductee
Chick Webb (1905–1939), jazz and swing drummer and bandleader; adopted Ella Fitzgerald
Wendy Weinberg, American Olympic medalist swimmer
Matthew Weiner (born 1965), creator of TV series Mad MenLeonard "Boogie" Weinglass (born 1941), founder of Merry-Go-Round clothing empire; portrayed by actor Mickey Rourke in 1982 film Diner''
Harry Wendelstedt (1938–2012), umpire in Major League Baseball
Terrance West (born 1991), former running back at Towson University and NFL player for the Cleveland Browns, Tennessee Titans, New Orleans Saints, and Baltimore Ravens
George Hoyt Whipple (1878–1976), graduated and taught medical school at Hopkins; won 1934 Nobel Prize in Medicine
Reggie White (born 1970), football player
Wade Whitney (born 1967), professional soccer player
William Pinkney Whyte (1824–1908), U.S. Senator, Governor of Maryland, Mayor of Baltimore
Emma Howard Wight (1863–1935), author
Bernard Williams (born 1978), gold medalist in 4 × 100 meter relay at 2000 Sydney Olympics
LaQuan Williams (born 1988), wide receiver for the Baltimore Ravens who attended Baltimore Polytechnic Institute
Montel Williams (born 1956), television personality
Reggie Williams (born 1964), professional basketball player
Trevor Williams (born 1993), football player
Mary Willis (born 1940), retired US Army Brigadier General
Ibbie McColm Wilson (1834–1908), poet
Oprah Winfrey (born 1954), television personality, actress, producer; born in rural Mississippi and raised in Milwaukee; worked at WJZ-TV in Baltimore
David Wingate (born 1963), professional basketball player
Danny Wiseman (born 1967), professional ten-pin bowler and 12-time winner on the PBA Tour
Edward Witten (born 1951), mathematical physicist and a leading researcher in string theory
James Wolcott (born 1952), journalist and cultural critic
Eliza Woods (1872–1961), composer
Bernie Wrightson (1948–2017), artist, known for horror illustrations and comic books
Natalie Wynn (born 1988), YouTube personality

Y
 John H. Yardley (1926–2011), pathologist
 Steve Yeager (born 1948), award-winning filmmaker, writer, stage director and educator
 Joe Yingling (1867–1903), professional baseball pitcher

Z
Geoff Zahn (born 1945), baseball pitcher
Frank Zappa (1940–1993), singer, guitarist, composer and satirist
 Nick Zedd (1958–2022), filmmaker, author, and painter
 Joanna Zeiger (born 1970), Olympic and world champion triathlete, and author
 Bruce Zimmermann, Professional Baseball Player
Lillian Zuckerman (1916–2004), actress

See also

References

External links
 

Baltimore
Baltimore-related lists
Baltimore